Tosena dives is a cicada species from Southeast Asia. The type was collected in Sylhet, Bangladesh. This species has also been recorded from Sikkim and Darjeeling in India.

References

Insects described in 1842
Insects of Bangladesh
Taxa named by John O. Westwood
Tosenini